The Triplespot blenny (Crossosalarias macrospilus) is a species combtooth blenny from the Western Pacific. It occasionally makes its way into the aquarium trade. It grows to a length of  TL.  This species is the only known member of its genus.

References

Salarinae
Monotypic fish genera
Fish described in 1971
Taxa named by Victor G. Springer